A shujra or shujrah is a detailed village map that is used for legal (land ownership) and administrative purposes in India and Pakistan. A shujra maps out the village lands into land parcels and gives each parcel a unique number. The patwari (or village accountant) maintains a record for each one of these parcels in documents called khasras.

Aks-Shajrah is the copy of the map.

Shajra also rendered as Shajra Nasab, shajarat, (Arabic/Urdu: شجرہ, Hindi: वंशावली), (synonyms: Ancestry, Pedigree, Genealogy, Lineage, Family Tree, Shajra, Family Chart) which means Tree of Ancestry. The term "Shajra" comes from the Arabic word شَجَر (Shajar), meaning "a tree" or "a plant." A conventional tree structure is similar to a genealogy/pedigree chart representing family relationships.

A Shajra records the ancestors from whom you directly descend and presents family information in the form of an easily readable chart. Shajra is often presented with the oldest generations at the top of the tree and the younger generations at the bottom and the most basic Shajra is made up of family members such as father, mother, father of father, father of mother, mother of mother, father's siblings, mother's siblings, spouse(s), and children.

See also

 Banjar, Jungle, Abadi, Shamlat, Gair Mumkin
 Barani, Nahri, Chahi, Taal
 Bigha
 Doab
 Khadir and Bangar
 Khasra
 Measurement of land in Punjab
 Patwari
 Zaildar

References

Law of India
Law of Pakistan
Land law